John Longmuir may refer to:
 John Longmuir (poet) (1803–1883), Scottish minister, antiquary, poet and lexicographer
 John Longmuir (tenor), Scottish-born Australian tenor